Carole Nelson (born 27 January 1971 in Paris) is a former French athlete, who specialized in the 400 meters hurdles.

Career  
Nelson was from French Guiana, where she trained under Louis Lafontaine. She started competing at the junior level in the late 1980s, and later trained with Stéphane Caristan.

She won the 400m hurdles at the annual  three times: in 1992, 1993 and 1994.

In 1993, she won the bronze medal at the Mediterranean Games, in Narbonne.

She continued to compete at the senior level, and in 1998 moved to Paris from Cayenne to escape the political turmoil in Guiana.

Records

References

Sources  
 Docathlé2003, Fédération française d'athlétisme, 2003, p. 423

1971 births
Living people
French female hurdlers
Athletes from Paris
Mediterranean Games bronze medalists for France
Mediterranean Games medalists in athletics
Athletes (track and field) at the 1993 Mediterranean Games